Thomas Harding (died 1532) was an English religious dissident 

Thomas Harding may also refer to:

Thomas Harding (1516–1572), English Catholic priest and controversialist
Thomas Harding (sailor) (1837–?), American Civil War Medal of Honor recipient, awarded in 1864
Thomas Harding (writer) (born 1968), British journalist, videographer and publisher
Thomas Harding (baseball writer), MLB.com Colorado Rockies beat writer
Thomas Walter Harding (1843–1927), English industrialist and civic figure
 Tom Harding, train engineer involved in the Lac-Mégantic derailment
Thomas Oliver Harding (1850–1896), Senior Wrangler at Cambridge University